Mapesbury is a residential area of northwest London, England. It forms one of twenty-one electoral wards of the London Borough of Brent.

Geography
The ward covers parts of the Kilburn and Cricklewood areas. Mapesbury ward is bounded to the north by Dollis Hill ward, to the west by Dudden Hill ward, to the south west by Willesden Green ward, to the south by Brondesbury Park ward, and to the east by the London Borough of Barnet and (further south) the London Borough of Camden.

Early history and name
The area formed part of the Middlesex parish and manor of Willesden, which was held by the chapter of  St Paul's Cathedral by the time of the Norman Conquest. The manor was divided into eight prebends to support the various members of the chapter. One of these duly gained the name "Mapesbury" after Walter Map, prebendary from 1173–c1192. Willesden Lane was known as Mapes Lane until the 1860s.

Development
Mapesbury remained countryside until the 1860s, when residential development began. By 1875 there were a number of large suburban villas.  Four years later the Metropolitan Railway opened its line in the area, and building lots were let for "first class residences". Mapesbury Farm was leased to builders in 1893, and Mapesbury Road constructed in the following year. The main development took place between 1895 and 1905, consisting of brick-built houses with extensive tree planting. In 1982 Mapesbury was designated a conservation area.

Politics
The ward returns three councillors to sit on Brent Council. At the 2006 election, the ward which had been a Labour/Conservative marginal elected three Liberal Democrat councillors. They retained their seats at the 2010 election, but at the 2014 election Labour took 2 of the 3 seats from the Liberal Democrats.

The ward forms part of the Brent Central parliamentary constituency and is represented in parliament by Dawn Butler of the Labour Party.

Demographics
Mapesbury ward has strong links to Irish culture and over 10% of its population are Irish. In the 2011 census it had the second largest number of Irish residents among wards in London.

Notable residents
 Ken Livingstone, former Mayor of London and MP for Brent East between 1987 and 2001, lives in Mapesbury.

References

Districts of the London Borough of Brent
Areas of London
Places formerly in Middlesex